Markus Anfang (born 12 June 1974) is a German retired footballer, who manages Dynamo Dresden.

Playing career
Anfang's career began in the late 80s at the northern Cologne low tier (Kreisliga) club KSV Heimersdorf. His first steps in the professional football league were done in 1995 with Fortuna Düsseldorf. Anfang also played for Schalke 04 before he decided to move to Austria where he played for FC Tirol Innsbruck. He won the Austrian Bundesliga in three consecutive years between 2000 and 2002. In the 2002–03 season he moved to 1. FC Kaiserslautern.

Having received as many as eight offers for transferring after disagreements at Kaiserslautern, he moved to FC Energie Cottbus in 2003 before joining MSV Duisburg in 2004, who he helped to the top division. He left Duisburg in 2006, returning to Düsseldorf, and then Innsbruck, before signing for Eintracht Trier in 2009.

Managerial career
After coaching SC Kapellen-Erft in one year with much success, Anfang was offered the job as youth coach in the academy of Bayer Leverkusen. He worked as youth coach of the academy from January 2013 to June 2013, and got the job as coach for the under-17 team.

On 29 August 2016, he was appointed as the new coach of Holstein Kiel. On 17 April 2018, 1. FC Köln announced he would become the new head coach for the 2018–19 season. His final match was a promotion–relegation match against VfL Wolfsburg. He finished with a record of 31 wins, 26 draws, and 14 losses. In the summer of 2018 he moved to 1. FC Köln, just to be sacked on 27 April 2019, placed first in the league table.

For the 2020–21 season, he moved to Darmstadt 98.

In June 2021, it was announced Anfang would become manager of SV Werder Bremen for the 2021–22 season. He resigned on 20 November 2021 due public prosecutors’ investigations into allegations that Anfang had used a forged COVID-19 vaccine certificate. The sports court of the German Football Association (DFB) issued a professional ban in January 2022 retrospectively from 20 November 2021 for one year. He also has to pay a fine of €20,000.

In the summer of 2022, he was appointed by Dynamo Dresden.

Managerial record

References

External links

1974 births
Living people
Association football midfielders
Footballers from Cologne
FC Energie Cottbus players
German expatriate footballers
Bundesliga players
2. Bundesliga players
1. FC Kaiserslautern players
Bayer 04 Leverkusen players
Fortuna Düsseldorf players
German footballers
MSV Duisburg players
FC Schalke 04 players
FC Wacker Innsbruck (2002) players
SV Eintracht Trier 05 players
Expatriate footballers in Austria
German expatriate sportspeople in Austria
3. Liga managers
Holstein Kiel managers
1. FC Köln managers
SV Darmstadt 98 managers
SV Werder Bremen managers
Dynamo Dresden managers
2. Bundesliga managers
German football managers
West German footballers
FC Tirol Innsbruck players